Hainan Airlines Co., Ltd. (HNA) is an airline headquartered in Haikou, Hainan, People's Republic of China. The airline is rated as a 5-star airline by Skytrax. It is the largest civilian-run and majority state-owned air transport company, making it the fourth-largest airline in terms of fleet size in the People's Republic of China, and the tenth-largest airline in Asia in terms of passengers carried, It operates scheduled domestic and international services on 500 routes from Hainan and nine locations on the mainland, as well as charter services. Its main base is located at Haikou Meilan International Airport, with hubs at Beijing Capital International Airport and Xi'an Xianyang International Airport and several focus cities.

History

Early years
Hainan Airlines was established in October 1989 as Hainan Province Airlines in Hainan, the largest special economic zone in China. Hainan Province Airlines became China's first joint-stock air-transport company following a restructuring in January 1993 and began scheduled services on 2 May 1993. The initial 250 million yuan (US$31.25 million) was financed by the Hainan government (5.33%) and the corporate staff (20%). The rest came from institutional shareholders. In 1996, the provincial airline was renamed Hainan Airlines.

American Aviation LLC, controlled by George Soros, had been a major shareholder of the airline since 1995.

Executive-jet operations with a Bombardier Learjet 55 were added in April 1995. In 1998, Hainan Airlines became the first Chinese carrier to own shares of an airport after it purchased 25% stake of Haikou Meilan International Airport.

Development since the 2000s

In 2000, HNA Group was established and became the third largest shareholder (7.31%) of Hainan Airlines. It also controlled Shanxi Airlines, Chang An Airlines and China Xinhua Airlines. By 2003 Hainan, the main airline, overtook Chang'an as the fourth largest airline in China.

In 2007 Grand China Air was established as the new holding company, when American Aviation became its subsidiary.

On 29 September 2005, HNA Group ordered 42 Boeing 787-8s, 10 of which were earmarked for the Hainan Airlines fleet. In January 2006, China Aviation Supplies Import and Export Group Corporation ordered 10 Boeing 737-800s for Hainan Airlines. In September 2006, Hainan Airlines ordered another 15 Boeing 737-800s.

On 4 December 2007, Hainan Airlines acquired three Airbus A340-600s on lease from International Lease Finance Corporation. On 14 November 2007, Hainan Airlines received its first Airbus A330-200. In June 2007, Hainan Airlines ordered 13 Airbus A320-200 aircraft. In late 2007, Hainan Airlines ordered 50 Embraer ERJ-145s and 50 Embraer 190s, with a total value (at list price) of  US$2.7 billion. The 50-seat ERJ-145s were produced by the Harbin Embraer Aircraft Industry (HEAI) joint venture, located in Harbin. E-190 deliveries began in December 2007. Due to the global financial crisis and huge losses incurred in 2008, the ERJ-145 order was reduced to 25. The E-190 order remained unchanged.

On 25 March 2015, Hainan Airlines announced its intention to acquire 30 Boeing 787-9s, which are all to join the Hainan Airlines Fleet. The delivery of the aircraft is scheduled to be completed by 2021. Two leased Boeing 787-9 aircraft were delivered in the spring of 2016. Hainan Airlines will also be among the first operators of the Comac C919, with deliveries begin in the 2020s.

Bankruptcy and restructuring
Hainan Airlines's parent company HNA Group announced on January 19, 2021 that it had entered bankruptcy restructuring after a government-led exercise to work out its debt failed to produce enough money to repay bondholders and creditors. As of September 24, 2021, HNA Group was broken into four components, one of which is the airline component, due to the bankruptcy court order. Liaoning Fangda Group Industrial, a conglomerate with business in the carbon, steel, and pharmaceuticals industries, will invest in the airline component.

Corporate affairs

Offices

Hainan Airlines and the HNA Group have their headquarters in the HNA Building, in Haikou, Hainan. With other office premises, HNA Tower, in focused cities including Beijing, Chongqing, Guangzhou, and Shanghai. It was previously headquartered in the HNA Development Building also known as the Haihang Development Building along Haixiu Road in Haikou.

Shareholders
, the Hainan provincial government owns 53.67% of Hainan Airlines' shares through Grand China Air Holding Company, which is controlled by the investment arm of the Hainan government. Grand China Air is the direct parent company of Hainan Airlines (24.33% shares directly; an additional 1.29% shares via a subsidiary American Aviation LDC), which was partially owned by Hainan Development Holdings (24.97%), HNA Group (23.11%), Starstep (9.57%), Haikou Meilan International Airport (8.30%), Shenhua Group (5.56%) and other shareholders. HNA Group owned 3.53% shares directly and via Changjiang Leasing, owned an additional 3.08% shares as the second largest shareholder. Haikou Meilan International Airport was the third largest shareholder for 5.13% shares. Moreover, HNA Group also owned Haikou Meilan International Airport partially, as well as Hainan Airlines as cross ownership. A private equity fund that was managed by Shanghai Pudong Development Bank, owned 4.91% shares as the fourth largest shareholder.

Destinations

As of January 2017, Hainan Airlines operates seven bases across China: Beijing–Capital, Guangzhou, Haikou, Hangzhou, Sanya, Shenzhen and Xi'an. It operates an extensive network across the People's Republic of China, connecting Asia, Europe, North America and Oceania. It serves nearly 500 domestic and international routes and flies to more than 90 cities.

Hainan operates regular international flights and offers charter flights to 51 destinations in 28 countries such as flights from Beijing to Almaty, Toronto, Berlin, Brussels, Seattle/Tacoma, St. Petersburg, Moscow, Tel Aviv, Chicago, Las Vegas, San Jose, California, and Boston; Beijing, Xi'an, Dalian, Guangzhou, Haikou to Taipei; Beijing, Haikou, Nanning to Bangkok; Hefei via Haikou to Singapore and others. Hainan also received official approval from the US DOT to begin nonstop flights between Beijing and Chicago. As of June 2014, Hainan began servicing Boston directly with a four-times-weekly 787 flight from Beijing Capital International Airport. It was the first direct flight between Boston and China. The airline began service in the second quarter of 2013 with the Boeing 787 Dreamliner aircraft. It was the first Chinese carrier to offer flights between the two cities. Flights from Beijing-Capital to Chicago-O'Hare began on 3 September 2013.

On 23 October 2015, Hainan announced flights to Manchester, United Kingdom, starting in summer 2016. Hainan announced the launch of a direct route between Beijing and Calgary, Canada, as of 30 June 2016. During the second half of 2017, Hainan Airlines began flights from Shanghai to Tel Aviv and restarted flights from Shanghai to Brussels. In late September 2017 Hainan Airlines commenced direct flights to and from Brisbane, Australia, several times per week, and also to Belgrade, Serbia, via Prague, every Monday and Friday. On 8 March 2018, Hainan Airlines announced flights between Changsha and London Heathrow, commencing 23 March 2018.
and on 15 March 2018, they announced round trip flights between Beijing–Capital, Dublin, and Edinburgh commencing 12 June 2018. In mid-October 2018, flights from Shenzhen to Vienna were launched. A non-stop route to Belgrade, Serbia was launched on 16 July 2022.

Codeshare agreements
Hainan Airlines has codeshare agreements with the following airlines:

 Aegean Airlines
 Air Serbia
 Alaska Airlines
 Alitalia
 Azul Brazilian Airlines
 Beijing Capital Airlines
 Brussels Airlines
 Czech Airlines
 Etihad Airways
 EVA Air
 Grand China Air
 GX Airlines
 Hong Kong Airlines
 Iberia
 Korean Air
 Lucky Air
 S7 Airlines
 Suparna Airlines
 Tianjin Airlines
 Uni Air
 WestJet
 Virgin Australia

Fleet

Current fleet

 the Hainan Airlines fleet consists of the following aircraft:

Former fleet
Hainan Airlines has previously operated the following aircraft:

Cabin

Business Class

Business class is available on all Hainan Airlines aircraft. Business class on the Airbus A330-200 is configured in a 2-2-2 configuration. The seats has a 74-inch seat pitch and a 10.6-inch personal entertainment system. Business class on the Airbus A330-300 features a 1-2-1 configuration. The seats are in a reversed herringbone layout with a seat pitch of 45-inches. The seats can recline up to 180 degrees and is nearly 2 meters long when converted into a bed. The seats feature a Thales AVANT 15.4-inch touchscreens with touch handle. The Airbus A350 business class seats are configured in a 1-2-1 layout with 27.5-inch wide seats and 76-inch long beds when fully reclined. The seats feature the Panasonic EX3 system with a 16-inch 1080P HD touch screen/remote control entertainment system. On the Boeing 787-8 and older Boeing 787-9s, business class features a 2-2-2 configuration and has a seat pitch between 73 and 80-inches. The seats feature a 16-inch touchscreen entertainment system equipped with BOSE noise-reducing head sets. Newer Boeing 787-9s equipped with the “Dream Feather” cabin design has business class seats similar to those on the Airbus A330-300s. The seats however feature increased seat pitch and improved  seat fabrics and decor.

Premium Economy
Premium economy is only available on newer Boeing 787-9 aircraft with the “Dream Feather” cabin design. The seats are designed by Collins MiQ and feature a 7-inch recline, 38-inch seat pitch and a 4-way adjustable head rest. The seats also feature a Panasonic EX3 Entertainment System and a 13 inch 1080p HD screen, as well as a USB Charing port, tablet stand and a footrest. Premium economy class seats are located in a separate cabin from the economy class seats.

Economy Class

Economy class is featured on all Hainan Airlines aircraft. Seats on long haul flights have a seat pitch of 32 inches as well as a 9-12 inch personal entertainment screen. USB ports are also available on newer aircraft.

Services

Lounges
Hainan Airlines operates several self-owned airport lounges at its main hub and focus cities including Beijing (T1 HNA Exclusive Terminal), Haikou, Xi'an, Guangzhou, and Urumqi. In addition, the airline will soon open its exclusive international departure lounge at its main international hub Beijing Capital International Airport Terminal 2. The airline also operates an exclusive Transit Lounge for transferring HNA Group passengers at Beijing Airport Non-restricted area.

Frequent-flyer program
Hainan Airlines's frequent-flyer program is called Fortune Wings Club. The airlines's subsidiaries Hong Kong Airlines, Lucky Air, Tianjin Airlines, Beijing Capital Airlines, Urumqi Airlines, Suparna Airlines, GX Airlines, Fuzhou Airlines and parent company Grand China Air are also parts of the program. It is also possible for passengers to collect miles on Alaska Airlines, Etihad Airways, Virgin Australia, TAP Portugal and the airlines that have codeshare agreements with Hainan Airlines.
Members can earn miles on flights as well as through consumption with Hainan Airlines's credit card. When enough miles are collected, members can be upgraded to Elite members which are divided into four tiers: Fortune Wings Platinum membership, Gold membership, Silver membership, and Flying Card membership. Elite membership get extra services.

Accolades
Hainan Airlines is one of ten airlines worldwide rated as five-star by Skytrax, along with All Nippon Airways, Asiana Airlines, Cathay Pacific, EVA Air, Garuda Indonesia, Japan Airlines, Lufthansa, Qatar Airways, and Singapore Airlines.

In June 2019 they were ranked #7 in the Skytrax World's Top 10 Airlines of 2019 ratings and were winners in the following additional categories: Best Airline in China: World's Best Business Class Amenities, Best Airline Staff in China, Best Airline Cabin Cleanliness in China, and Best Cabin Crew in China.

See also
Transport in China

References

External links

HNA Group

 
Airlines of China
Chinese brands
Airlines established in 1989
Government-owned companies of China
Companies based in Hainan
Organizations based in Haikou
HNA Group
Chinese companies established in 1989